The Roasting Ear Church and School is a historic multifunction building in rural northwestern Stone County, Arkansas.  It is located northeast of Onia, on County Road 48 west of its junction with County Road 86 (Roasting Ear Road).  It is a single-story wood-frame structure, with a front-facing gable roof, weatherboard siding, and stone foundation.  The main facade has a pair of symmetrically placed entrances with transom windows and simple molding, and otherwise lacks adornment.  Built c. 1918, it is a well-preserved example of a typical rural Arkansas structure built to house both a church congregation and a local school.

The building was listed on the National Register of Historic Places in 1985.

See also
National Register of Historic Places listings in Stone County, Arkansas

References

Churches in Arkansas
Churches on the National Register of Historic Places in Arkansas
Churches completed in 1918
Churches in Stone County, Arkansas
National Register of Historic Places in Stone County, Arkansas